Jordan Mark Boon (born 26 November 2000) is a professional footballer who plays as a defender for Wythenshawe Town.

Career

Bolton Wanderers
Boon came through the Bolton Wanderers Academy. In December 2019, Boon joined Northwich Victoria on a one-month loan deal. He made his debut against Irlam on 26 December as a 7th minute substitute, replacing Kieron Kenny in an eventual 4–0 win. He played two more league matches for Northwich Victoria before returning to Bolton in January 2019. On 21 May 2019, Bolton extended Boon's scholarship contract for another year. He made his Bolton, and professional, debut on 13 August 2019 against Rochdale in the EFL Cup, coming on as a 54th minute substitute, replacing Liam Edwards. Bolton lost 5–2. Four days later he made his league debut against Tranmere Rovers, coming on as a 68th minute substitute for Joe White. Bolton lost 5–0. His first start came on 31 August in another 5–0 defeat. On 31 January 2020, Boon joined Atherton Collieries on loan. He made his debut a day later in a 3–1 defeat against Whitby Town. This was the only match he played for them before returning to Bolton.

IFK Östersund
On 11 March 2020, Boon left Bolton by mutual consent to join Swedish Division 2 side IFK Östersund. Within the first few weeks of training boon suffered an injury and then lead him fly back home with other factors including the COVID-19 pandemic making him unable to return.

Spennymoor Town
On 19 September 2020 Boon signed for Spennymoor Town after a successful trial. He played three matches. He was released on 18 December.

Poynton FC
He signed for Cheshire Association Football League Premier Division side Poynton FC for the 2021–22 season.

Banyule City
On 3 January 2022, he signed for Victorian State League Division 1 side Banyule City in Australia.

Wythenshawe Town
He signed for Wythenshawe Town for the 2022–23 season.

Career statistics

Notes

References

Living people
2000 births
English footballers
Association football defenders
Bolton Wanderers F.C. players
Northwich Victoria F.C. players
Atherton Collieries A.F.C. players
Spennymoor Town F.C. players
Wythenshawe Town F.C. players